Holy Trinity Cathedral and The Russian Orthodox Spiritual and Cultural Center is a complex that consists of 4 buildings in Paris, France: the Cultural Center found on Quai Branly, an educational complex in University Street, an administrative building in Rapp Street and the Holy Trinity Cathedral of the Russian Orthodox Church. 

The opening was attended 19 March 2016 by Mayor of Paris Anne Hidalgo, as well as Russia's Minister of Culture Vladimir Medinsky and representatives of the Moscow Patriarchate. Russian Minister of Culture Vladimir Medinsky stated at the inaugural opening on October 19, 2016 that “the centre will open its doors to anyone who is interested in the history of our country, our scientific and cultural accomplishments, and for those who want to learn Russian. The Holy Trinity Cathedral will undoubtedly play an important role for the Orthodox people in Paris.”

The Cathedral was one of the most visited places during the Days of the French National Heritage held in September 2017. According to approximate data it was visited by no less than 12,000 people.

References

Russian Orthodox cathedrals in France
Eastern Orthodox church buildings in Paris
Cathedrals in Paris
Church buildings with domes